Harold Wood is a suburban neighbourhood of Romford in the London Borough of Havering.

History

Toponymy
The name Harold Wood was recorded in about 1237, when it was shown as Horalds Wood. It was named after King Harold Godwinson, who was defeated by William the Conqueror in 1066. He held the surrounding manor of Havering-atte-Bower. Some of the original roads are named after Anglo-Saxon kings such as Æthelstan and Alfred the Great.

Local government
Harold Wood formed a ward in the ancient parish of Hornchurch, although the area now around the station was in the North End ward. The eastern and southern boundary of the parish was the River Ingrebourne such that the area around Harold Court was in the parish of Upminster. Although locally situated within Essex the ancient Hornchurch parish formed the independent Liberty of Havering and was outside county administration. Harold Wood ward came under the control of the vestry of Romford chapelry, which also included Collier Row and Noak Hill, however most of the current area of Harold Wood was in the North End ward which remained under Hornchurch parish vestry. In 1836 Romford and Hornchurch became separate civil parishes and were grouped into the Romford Poor Law Union. The area of the union, excluding the town of Romford, became a rural sanitary district in 1875. The special status of the Liberty of Havering was abolished in 1892 and the area was reincorporated into Essex.

Following the Local Government Act 1894, the Romford parish was split with the northern part of the Harold Wood ward becoming a new parish of Noak Hill and the southern part forming part of the Romford Rural parish, both within the Romford Rural District. This split the administration of the area between the Hornchurch, Romford Rural, Noak Hill and Upminster parish councils, and the Romford Rural District Council. In 1900 the Romford Rural parish was recombined with Romford Urban (which consisted of the town of Romford) to form an expanded Romford Urban District. With suburban house building, the population in the area started to rise soon after which prompted changes to the local government system. Hornchurch parish became the Hornchurch Urban District in 1926 and Upminster was added to it in 1934. The area formed part of the London Traffic Area from 1924 and the London Passenger Transport Area from 1933.  The whole area was included in the London Borough of Havering in 1965 when it was transferred from Essex to Greater London.

Urban development

Harold Wood Hospital, on Gubbins Lane, closed on 13 December 2006 with all patients moved to Queen's Hospital in nearby Romford. The site vacated by the hospital was earmarked for a 470-home housing development which faced fierce opposition from the local population. As of February 2023, the Kings Park estate has been completed.

Education

There are three schools in Harold Wood:
 Secondary - Redden Court School
 Primary - Harold Wood Primary School and Harold Court Primary School

Geography

Harold Wood borders with the following places:

 Ardleigh Green
 Gidea Park
 Harold Park
 Harold Hill
 Hornchurch
 Brentwood

Demography
86% of the population is White British, as of the 2011 census.

Transport

Buses
Harold Wood is served by several London Bus routes:

 Daily routes include 256, 294, 496, 497, 498 and 499
 Mon–Sat 347
 School routes 646, 656 and 608

Railway
Harold Wood railway station is situated on the Great Eastern Main Line and the Elizabeth line. It is served generally by eight trains an hour each way between London Paddington and Shenfield on the Elizabeth line; services are operated by TfL. As of February 2023, trains run from Shenfield to Paddington via Whitechapel, London Liverpool Street, Farringdon and  Tottenham Court Road.
The nearest tube stations to Harold Wood are Upminster Bridge and Hornchurch, both on the District line.

Roads
The M25 motorway runs along the easterly boundary and the A12 and A127 roads form the north-west and south-west borders respectively.

References

Areas of London
Districts of the London Borough of Havering